The Asociación de Guías y Scouts de Costa Rica is the national Scouting and Guiding association of Costa Rica. Scouting was founded in Costa Rica in 1915 and became a member of the World Organization of the Scout Movement in 1935. Guiding started in 1922 and became a member of the World Association of Girl Guides and Girl Scouts in 1946. The association has more than 14,500 members of both genders.

An interesting aspect of Scouting in Costa Rica is a University course on Scouting. This course is mandatory for all future teachers. The course highlights the educational value of Scouting.

Scouting in Costa Rica has an emphasis on community service, rural Scouting and nature conservation projects. The association has a National Office and 8 regional offices throughout nine regions of Costa Rica (San José, Central and Northern Alajuela, Heredia, Cartago, Guanacaste, Puntarenas, Brunca, and Limón). Each regional office has a regional executive that links the region to the National Office.

Program

Lobatos and Lobatas -ages 7 to 11
Scouts and Guides-ages 11 to 15
Tsurís -ages 15 to 17
Rovers and Senior Guides -ages 18 to 21

The Scout and Guide Motto is Siempre listos para servir, Always ready to serve.

Scout Promise

Por mi honor y con la ayuda de Dios, prometo hacer todo lo posible por cumplir mis deberes para con Dios y la patria, ayudar al projimo en toda circunstancia y cumplir fielmente la Ley Guía y Scout.

By my honour and with God's help, I promise to do everything possible to obey all my obligations with God and my nation, help my neighbour in all circumstances, and loyally obey the Law of Scouts and Guides.

Scout and Guide Law
 A Scout shows his honor by being worthy of trust.
 A Scout is loyal to God, his nation, his parents, his superiors, and his subordinates.
 A Scout is useful and helps others without thinking of rewards.
 A Scout is everybody's friend and brother/sister of all Scouts, without distinction of creed, race, nationality, or social class.
 A Scout is courteous and well mannered.
 A Scout sees God's work in nature. He or she protects animals and plants.
 A Scout obeys rationally and does things in an orderly and complete manner.
 A Scout smiles and sings through difficult times.
 A Scout is efficient, hard-working, and careful of others' well-being. (The original Spanish phrase, cuidadoso del bien ajeno, can also mean "respectful of others' properties".)
 A Scout is clean and healthy; pure in his thoughts, words, and actions.

External links 
 Official homepage

References 

World Association of Girl Guides and Girl Scouts member organizations
World Organization of the Scout Movement member organizations
Scouting and Guiding in Costa Rica
Youth organizations established in 1915